ABS, formerly Asia Broadcast Satellite, is a global satellite operator incorporated in Bermuda. Operating 5 communication satellites, the satellite fleet currently covers 93% of the world's population including the Americas, Africa, Asia Pacific, Europe, the Middle East, Russia and Commonwealth of Independent States.

History

ABS was established in 2006 with major shareholder Citigroup Venture Capital International (CVCI) and the financial backing of Asia Debt Management Capital (ADM). The company acquired its first satellite, a Lockheed Martin Intersputnik 1 (LMI-1, a high powered Lockheed Martin A2100 AX satellite, in 2006, from Lockheed Martin Space Communications Ventures, Ltd (LMSCV) and Lockheed Martin Interputnik Ltd (LMI) from Lockheed Martin Global Telecommunications (LMGT). LMI-1 satellite was renamed ABS-1.

Currently, ABS owns and operates 5 satellites, including ABS-2, ABS-2A, ABS-3A, ABS-4 and ABS-6.

Services

Satellites

References

External links
ABS Company Website

Communications satellite operators
Aerospace companies of Bermuda